Aleš Jindra (born 12 June 1973) is a Czech football coach and a former football player.

Before moving to Romania, he was the assistant coach of the Czech 2. Liga team FK Baník Sokolov.

References

External links
 

1973 births
Living people
Sportspeople from Plzeň
Czech footballers
Czech First League players
FC Viktoria Plzeň players
FK Chmel Blšany players
Czech football managers
FK Baník Sokolov managers
CFR Cluj managers
Association football midfielders
FC Augsburg players